Ray Charles Robinson Sr. (September 23, 1930 – June 10, 2004) was an American singer, songwriter, pianist and alto saxophonist. He is regarded as one of the most iconic and influential singers in history, and was often referred to by contemporaries as "The Genius". Among friends and fellow musicians he preferred being called "Brother Ray". Charles was blinded during childhood, possibly due to glaucoma.

Charles pioneered the soul music genre during the 1950s by combining blues, jazz, rhythm and blues, and gospel styles into the music he recorded for Atlantic Records. He contributed to the integration of country music, rhythm and blues, and pop music during the 1960s with his crossover success on ABC Records, notably with his two Modern Sounds albums. While he was with ABC, Charles became one of the first black musicians to be granted artistic control by a mainstream record company.

Charles's 1960 hit "Georgia On My Mind" was the first of his three career No. 1 hits on the Billboard Hot 100. His 1962 album Modern Sounds In Country And Western Music became his first album to top the Billboard 200. Charles had multiple singles reach the Top 40 on various Billboard charts: 44 on the US R&B singles chart, 11 on the Hot 100 singles chart, 2 on the Hot Country singles charts.

Charles cited Nat King Cole as a primary influence, but his music was also influenced by Louis Jordan and Charles Brown. He had a lifelong friendship and occasional partnership with Quincy Jones. Frank Sinatra called Ray Charles "the only true genius in show business," although Charles downplayed this notion. Billy Joel said, "This may sound like sacrilege, but I think Ray Charles was more important than Elvis Presley".

For his musical contributions, Charles received the Kennedy Center Honors, the National Medal of Arts, and the Polar Music Prize. He was one of the inaugural inductees at the Rock and Roll Hall of Fame in 1986. He has won 18 Grammy Awards (5 posthumously), the Grammy Lifetime Achievement Award in 1987, and 10 of his recordings have been inducted into the Grammy Hall of Fame. Rolling Stone ranked Charles No. 10 on their list of the 100 Greatest Artists of All Time, and No. 2 on their list of the 100 Greatest Singers of All Time. In 2022, he was inducted into the Country Music Hall of Fame, as well as the Black Music & Entertainment Walk of Fame.

Early life and education
Ray Charles Robinson was born on September 23, 1930, in Albany, Georgia. He was the son of Bailey Robinson, a laborer, and Aretha (or Reatha) Robinson (née Williams), a laundress, of Greenville, Florida.

During Aretha's childhood, her mother died. Her father could not keep her. Bailey, a man her father worked with, took her in. The Robinson family—Bailey, his wife Mary Jane, and his mother— informally adopted her and Aretha took the surname Robinson. A few years later 15-year-old Aretha became pregnant by Bailey. During the ensuing scandal, she left Greenville late in the summer of 1930 to be with family back in Albany. After the birth of the child, Ray Charles, she and the infant Charles returned to Greenville. Aretha and Bailey's wife, who had lost a son, then shared in Charles's upbringing. The father abandoned the family, left Greenville, and married another woman elsewhere. By his first birthday, Charles had a brother, George. Later, no one could remember who George's father was.

Charles was deeply devoted to his mother and later recalled, despite her poor health and adversity, her perseverance, self-sufficiency, and pride as guiding lights in his life.

In his early years, Charles showed an interest in mechanical objects and would often watch his neighbors working on their cars and farm machinery. His musical curiosity was sparked at Wylie Pitman's Red Wing Cafe, at the age of three, when Pitman played boogie woogie on an old upright piano; Pitman subsequently taught Charles how to play the piano. Charles and his mother were always welcome at the Red Wing Cafe and even lived there when they were in financial distress. Pitman would also care for Ray's younger brother George, to take some of the burden off their mother. George accidentally drowned in his mother's laundry tub when he was four years old.

Charles started to lose his sight at the age of four or five, and was blind by the age of seven, likely as a result of glaucoma. Destitute, uneducated, and mourning the loss of her younger son, Aretha Robinson used her connections in the local community to find a school that would accept a blind African-American pupil. Despite his initial protest, Charles attended school at the Florida School for the Deaf and the Blind in St. Augustine from 1937 to 1945.

Charles further developed his musical talent at school and was taught to play the classical piano music of Bach, Mozart and Beethoven. His teacher, Mrs. Lawrence, taught him how to use braille music, a difficult process that requires learning the left hand movements by reading braille with the right hand and learning the right hand movements by reading braille with the left hand,  then combining the two parts.

Charles's mother died in the spring of 1945, when he was 14. Her death came as a shock to him; he later said the deaths of his brother and mother were "the two great tragedies" of his life. Charles decided not to return to school after the funeral.

Career

1945–1952: Florida, Los Angeles, and Seattle
After leaving school, Charles moved to Jacksonville to live with Charles Wayne Powell, who had been friends with his late mother. He played the piano for bands at the Ritz Theatre in LaVilla for over a year, earning $4 a night (US$, in  value). He joined Local 632 of the American Federation of Musicians, in the hope that it would help him get work, and was able to use the union hall's piano to practice, since he did not have one at home; he learned piano licks from copying the other players there. He started to build a reputation as a talented musician in Jacksonville, but the jobs did not come fast enough for him to construct a strong identity, so, at age 16, he moved to Orlando, where he lived in borderline poverty and went without food for days. It was difficult for musicians to find work; since World War II had ended, there were no "G.I. Joes" left to entertain. Charles eventually started to write arrangements for a pop music band, and in the summer of 1947, he unsuccessfully auditioned to play piano for Lucky Millinder and his sixteen-piece band.

In 1947, Charles moved to Tampa, where he held two jobs, including one as a pianist for Charles Brantley's Honey Dippers.

In his early career, Charles modeled himself on Nat King Cole. His first four recordings—"Wondering and Wondering", "Walking and Talking", "Why Did You Go?" and "I Found My Baby There"—were allegedly done in Tampa, although some discographies claim he recorded them in Miami in 1951 or else Los Angeles in 1952.

Charles had always played piano for other people, but he was keen to have his own band. He decided to leave Florida for a large city, and, considering Chicago and New York City too big, followed his friend Gossie McKee to Seattle, Washington, in March 1948, knowing that the biggest radio hits came from northern cities. There he met and befriended, under the tutelage of Robert Blackwell, the 15-year-old Quincy Jones.

With Charles on piano, McKee on guitar, and Milton Garred on bass, the McSon Trio (named for McKee and Robinson) started playing the 1–5 A.M. shift at the Rocking Chair. Publicity photos of this trio are some of the earliest known photographs of Charles. In April 1949, he and his band recorded "Confession Blues", which became his first national hit, soaring to the second spot on the Billboard R&B chart. While still working at the Rocking Chair, Charles also arranged songs for other artists, including Cole Porter's "Ghost of a Chance" and Dizzy Gillespie's "Emanon". After the success of his first two singles, Charles moved to Los Angeles in 1950 and spent the next few years touring with the blues musician Lowell Fulson as Fulson's musical director.

In 1950, Charles' performance in a Miami hotel impressed Henry Stone, who went on to record a Ray Charles Rockin' record, which did not achieve popularity. During his stay in Miami, Charles was required to stay in the segregated but thriving black community of Overtown. Stone later helped Jerry Wexler find Charles in St. Petersburg.

After signing with Swing Time Records, Charles recorded two more R&B hits under the name Ray Charles: "Baby, Let Me Hold Your Hand" (1951), which reached No. 5, and "Kissa Me Baby" (1952), which reached No. 8. Swing Time folded the following year, and Ahmet Ertegun signed Charles to Atlantic.

In addition to being a musician, Charles was also a record producer, producing Guitar Slim's number 1 hit, "The Things That I Used to Do".

1952–1959: Atlantic Records

In June 1952, Atlantic bought Charles's contract for $2,500 (US$ in  dollars). His first recording session for Atlantic ("The Midnight Hour"/"Roll with My Baby") took place in September 1952, although his last Swing Time release ("Misery in My Heart"/"The Snow Is Falling") would not appear until February 1953.

In 1953, "Mess Around" became his first small hit for Atlantic; during the next year, he had hits with "It Should've Been Me" and "Don't You Know". He also recorded the songs "Midnight Hour" and "Sinner's Prayer" around this time.

Late in 1954, Charles recorded "I've Got a Woman". The lyrics were written by bandleader Renald Richard. Charles claimed the composition. They later admitted that the song went back to the Southern Tones' "It Must Be Jesus" (1954). It became one of his most notable hits, reaching No. 2 on the R&B chart. "I've Got a Woman" combined gospel, jazz, and blues elements. In 1955, he had hits with "This Little Girl of Mine" and "A Fool for You". In upcoming years, hits included "Drown in My Own Tears" and "Hallelujah I Love Her So".

Charles also recorded jazz, such as The Great Ray Charles (1957). He worked with vibraphonist Milt Jackson, releasing Soul Brothers in 1958 and Soul Meeting in 1961. By 1958, he was not only headlining major black venues such as the Apollo Theater in New York, but also larger venues such as Carnegie Hall and the Newport Jazz Festival, where his first live album was recorded in 1958. He hired a female singing group, the Cookies, and renamed them the Raelettes. In 1958, Charles and the Raelettes performed for the famed Cavalcade of Jazz concert produced by Leon Hefflin Sr. held at the Shrine Auditorium on August 3. The other headliners were Little Willie John, Sam Cooke, Ernie Freeman, and Bo Rhambo. Sammy Davis Jr. was also there to crown the winner of the Miss Cavalcade of Jazz beauty contest. The event featured the top four prominent disc jockeys of Los Angeles.

Charles reached the pinnacle of his success at Atlantic with the release of "What'd I Say", which combined gospel, jazz, blues and Latin music. Charles said he wrote it spontaneously while he was performing in clubs with his band. Despite some radio stations banning the song because of its sexually suggestive lyrics, the song became Charles' first top-ten pop record.[35] It reached No. 6 on the Billboard Pop chart and No. 1 on the Billboard R&B chart in 1959. Later that year, he released his first country song (a cover of Hank Snow's "I'm Movin' On") and recorded three more albums for the label: a jazz record (The Genius After Hours, 1961); a blues record (The Genius Sings the Blues, 1961); and a big band record (The Genius of Ray Charles, 1959) which was his first Top 40 album, peaking at No. 17.[36]

1959–1971: Crossover success

Charles' contract with Atlantic expired in 1959, and several big labels offered him record deals. Choosing not to renegotiate his contract with Atlantic, he signed with ABC-Paramount in November 1959. He obtained a more liberal contract than other artists had at the time, with ABC offering him a $50,000 (US$ in  dollars) annual advance, higher royalties than before, and eventual ownership of his master tapes—a very valuable and lucrative deal at the time. During his Atlantic years, Charles had been hailed for his inventive compositions, but by the time of the release of the largely instrumental jazz album Genius + Soul = Jazz (1960) for ABC's subsidiary label Impulse!, he had given up on writing in favor of becoming a cover artist, giving his own eclectic arrangements of existing songs.

With "Georgia on My Mind", his first hit single for ABC-Paramount in 1960, Charles received national acclaim and four Grammy Awards, including two for "Georgia on My Mind" (Best Vocal Performance Single Record or Track, Male, and Best Performance by a Pop Single Artist). Written by Stuart Gorrell and Hoagy Carmichael, the song was Charles' first work with Sid Feller, who produced, arranged and conducted the recording. Charles' rendition of the tune would help elevate it to the status of an American classic, and his version also became the state song of Georgia later on in 1979.

Charles earned another Grammy for the follow-up track "Hit the Road Jack", written by R&B singer Percy Mayfield.

By late 1961, Charles had expanded his small road ensemble to a big band, partly as a response to increasing royalties and touring fees, becoming one of the few black artists to cross over into mainstream pop with such a level of creative control. This success, however, came to a momentary halt during a concert tour in November 1961, when a police search of Charles's hotel room in Indianapolis, Indiana, led to the discovery of heroin in the medicine cabinet. The case was eventually dropped, as the search lacked a proper warrant by the police, and Charles soon returned to music.

In the early 1960s, on the way from Louisiana to Oklahoma City, Charles faced a near-death experience when the pilot of his plane lost visibility, as snow and his failure to use the defroster caused the windshield of the plane to become completely covered in ice. The pilot made a few circles in the air before he was finally able to see through a small part of the windshield and land the plane. Charles placed a spiritual interpretation on the experience, claiming that "something or someone which instruments cannot detect" was responsible for creating the small opening in the ice on the windshield which enabled the pilot to eventually land the plane safely.

The 1962 album Modern Sounds in Country and Western Music and its sequel, Modern Sounds in Country and Western Music, Vol. 2, helped to bring country music into the musical mainstream. Charles's version of the Don Gibson song "I Can't Stop Loving You" topped the Pop chart for five weeks, stayed at No. 1 on the R&B chart for ten weeks, and gave him his only number-one record in the UK. In 1962, he founded his record label, Tangerine, which ABC-Paramount promoted and distributed.  He had major pop hits in 1963 with "Busted" (US No. 4) and "Take These Chains from My Heart" (US No. 8). In 1964, Margie Hendrix was kicked out of the Raelettes after a big argument.

In 1964, Charles's career was halted once more after he was arrested for a third time for possession of heroin. He agreed to go to a rehabilitative facility to avoid jail time and eventually kicked his habit at a clinic in Los Angeles. After spending a year on parole, Charles reappeared in the charts in 1966 with a series of hits composed with Ashford & Simpson and Jo Armstead, including the dance number "I Don't Need No Doctor" and "Let's Go Get Stoned", which became his first number-one R&B hit in several years. His cover version of "Crying Time", originally recorded by country singer Buck Owens, reached No. 6 on the pop chart and helped Charles win a Grammy Award the following March. In 1967, he had a top-twenty hit with another ballad, "Here We Go Again".

1971–1983: Commercial decline

Charles's renewed chart success, however, proved to be short lived, and by the 1970s his music was rarely played on radio stations. The rise of psychedelic rock and harder forms of rock and R&B music had reduced Charles's radio appeal, as did his choosing to record pop standards and covers of contemporary rock and soul hits, since his earnings from owning his master tapes had taken away the motivation to write new material. Charles nonetheless continued to have an active recording career. Most of his recordings between 1968 and 1973 evoked strong reactions: either adored or panned by fans and critics alike. His recordings during this period, especially 1972's A Message from the People, moved toward the progressive soul sound popular at the time. A Message from the People included his unique gospel-influenced version of "America the Beautiful" and a number of protest songs about poverty and civil rights. Charles was often criticized for his version of "America the Beautiful" because it was very drastically changed from the song's original version. On July 14, 1973, Margie Hendrix, the mother of Ray's son Charles Wayne Hendrix, died at 38 years old, which led to Ray having to care for the child. The official cause of her death is unknown.

In 1974, Charles left ABC Records and recorded several albums on his own label, Crossover Records. A 1975 recording of Stevie Wonder's hit "Living for the City" later helped Charles win another Grammy. In 1977, he reunited with Ahmet Ertegun and re-signed to Atlantic Records, for which he recorded the album True to Life, remaining with his old label until 1980. However, the label had now begun to focus on rock acts, and some of their prominent soul artists, such as Aretha Franklin, were starting to be neglected. In November 1977 he appeared as the host of the NBC television show Saturday Night Live.

In April 1979, his version of "Georgia on My Mind" was proclaimed the state song of Georgia, and an emotional Charles performed the song on the floor of the state legislature. In 1980 Charles performed in the musical film The Blues Brothers. Although he had notably supported the American Civil Rights Movement and Martin Luther King Jr. in the 1960s, Charles was criticized for performing at the Sun City resort in South Africa in 1981 during an international boycott protesting that country's apartheid policy. He later defended his choice of performing there, insisting that the audience of black and white fans would integrate while he was there.

1983–2004: Later years
In 1983, Charles signed a contract with Columbia. He recorded a string of country albums and had hit singles in duets with singers such as George Jones, Chet Atkins, B. J. Thomas, Mickey Gilley, Hank Williams Jr., Dee Dee Bridgewater ("Precious Thing") and his longtime friend Willie Nelson, with whom he recorded "Seven Spanish Angels".

In 1985, Charles participated in the musical recording and video "We Are the World", a charity single recorded by the supergroup United Support of Artists (USA) for Africa.

Before the release of his first album for Warner, Would You Believe, Charles made a return to the R&B charts with a cover of the Brothers Johnson's "I'll Be Good to You", a duet with his lifelong friend Quincy Jones and the singer Chaka Khan, which hit number one on the R&B chart in 1990 and won Charles and Khan a Grammy for their duet. Prior to this, Charles returned to the pop charts with "Baby Grand", a duet with singer-songwriter Billy Joel. In 1989, he recorded a cover of the Southern All Stars' "Itoshi no Ellie" for a Japanese TV advertisement for the Suntory brand, releasing it in Japan as "Ellie My Love", where it reached No.3 on its Oricon chart. In the same year he was a special guest at the Arena di Verona during the tour promoting Oro Incenso & Birra of the Italian singer Zucchero Fornaciari.

In 2001–02, Charles appeared in commercials for the New Jersey Lottery to promote its campaign "For every dream, there's a jackpot".

In 2003, he headlined the White House Correspondents' Association Dinner in Washington, D.C., attended by President George W. Bush, Laura Bush, Colin Powell and Condoleezza Rice.

Also in 2003, Charles presented Van Morrison with Morrison's award upon being inducted in the Songwriters Hall of Fame, and the two sang Morrison's song "Crazy Love" (the performance appears on Morrison's 2007 album The Best of Van Morrison Volume 3). In 2003, Charles performed "Georgia on My Mind" and "America the Beautiful" at a televised annual banquet of electronic media journalists held in Washington, D.C. His final public appearance was on April 30, 2004, at the dedication of his music studio as a historic landmark in Los Angeles.

Legacy

Influence on music industry
Charles possessed one of the most recognizable voices in American music. In the words of musicologist Henry Pleasants:

Pleasants continues, "Ray Charles is usually described as a baritone, and his speaking voice would suggest as much, as would the difficulty he experiences in reaching and sustaining the baritone's high E and F in a popular ballad. But the voice undergoes some sort of transfiguration under stress, and in music of gospel or blues character he can and does sing for measures on end in the high tenor range of A, B flat, B, C and even C sharp and D, sometimes in full voice, sometimes in an ecstatic head voice, sometimes in falsetto. In falsetto he continues up to E and F above high C. On one extraordinary record, 'I'm Going Down to the River'...he hits an incredible B flat...giving him an overall range, including the falsetto extension, of at least three octaves."

His style and success in the genres of rhythm and blues and jazz had an influence on a number of highly successful artists, including, as Jon Pareles has noted, Elvis Presley, Aretha Franklin, Stevie Wonder, Van Morrison, and Billy Joel. Other singers who have acknowledged Charles's influence on their own styles include James Booker, Steve Winwood, Richard Manuel, and Gregg Allman. According to Joe Levy, a music editor for Rolling Stone, "The hit records he made for Atlantic in the mid-1950s mapped out everything that would happen to rock 'n' roll and soul music in the years that followed". Charles was also an inspiration to Pink Floyd member Roger Waters, who told the Turkish newspaper Hürriyet: "I was about 15. In the middle of the night with friends, we were listening to jazz. It was "Georgia on My Mind", Ray Charles's version. Then I thought 'One day, if I make some people feel only one-twentieth of what I am feeling now, it will be quite enough for me.'"

Ray, a biopic portraying his life and career between the mid-1930s and 1979, was released in October 2004, starring Jamie Foxx as Charles. Foxx won the 2005 Academy Award for Best Actor for the role.

Awards and honors

In 1975, Ray Charles was inducted into the American Academy of Achievement and presented with the Golden Plate Award and the Academy of Achievement gold medal.

In 1979, Charles was one of the first musicians born in the state to be inducted into the Georgia Music Hall of Fame. His version of "Georgia on My Mind" was also made the official state song of the state of Georgia.

In 1981, he was given a star on the Hollywood Walk of Fame and was one of the first inductees to the Rock & Roll Hall of Fame at its inaugural ceremony, in 1986. He also received the Kennedy Center Honors in 1986.

Charles won 17 Grammy Awards from his 37 nominations. In 1987, he was awarded the Grammy Lifetime Achievement Award.

In 1991, he was inducted to the Rhythm & Blues Foundation and was presented with the George and Ira Gershwin Award for Lifetime Musical Achievement during the 1991 UCLA Spring Sing.

In 1990, he was given an honorary doctorate of fine arts by the University of South Florida.

In 1993, he was awarded the National Medal of Arts. In 1998 he was awarded the Polar Music Prize, together with Ravi Shankar, in Stockholm, Sweden. In 2004 he was inducted to the National Black Sports & Entertainment Hall of Fame. The Grammy Awards of 2005 were dedicated to Charles.

In 2001, Morehouse College honored Charles with the Candle Award for Lifetime Achievement in Arts and Entertainment, and later that same year granted him an honorary doctor of humane letters. Charles donated $2 million to Morehouse "to fund, educate and inspire the next generation of musical pioneers."

In 2003, Charles was awarded an honorary degree by Dillard University, and upon his death he endowed a professorship of African-American culinary history at the school, the first such chair in the nation.

On September 22, 2004, Ray Charles was honored with a Google Doodle on what would have been his 74th birthday.  It was one of the first Doodles for one’s birthday.

In 2010, a $20 million,  facility named the Ray Charles Performing Arts Center and Music Academic Building, opened at Morehouse.

The United States Postal Service issued a forever stamp honoring Charles, as part of its Musical Icons series, on September 23, 2013.

In 2015, Charles was inducted into the Rhythm and Blues Music Hall of Fame.

In 2016, U.S. President Barack Obama said, "Ray Charles's version of "America the Beautiful" will always be in my view the most patriotic piece of music ever performed"

In 2022, Charles was posthumously inducted into the Country Music Hall of Fame, the third African-American to be inducted after Charley Pride (2000) and Deford Bailey (2005). He was also the 13th person to be inducted into both the Country and Rock Halls of Fame.

Contribution to civil rights movement
On March 15, 1961, shortly after the release of the hit song "Georgia on My Mind" (1960), the Albany, Georgia-born musician was scheduled to perform at a dance at Bell Auditorium in Augusta, but cancelled the show after learning from students of Paine College that the larger auditorium dance floor would be restricted to whites, while blacks would be obligated to sit in the Music Hall balcony. Charles left town immediately after letting the public know why he would not be performing, but the promoter went on to sue Charles for breach of contract, and Charles was fined $757 in Fulton County Superior Court in Atlanta on June 14, 1962. The following year, Charles did perform at a desegregated Bell Auditorium concert together with his backup singers, the Raelettes,  on October 23, 1963, as depicted in the 2004 film, Ray. On December 7, 2007, Ray Charles Plaza was opened in Albany, Georgia, with a revolving, lighted bronze sculpture of Charles seated at a piano.

The Ray Charles Foundation
Founded in 1986, the Ray Charles Foundation maintains the mission statement of financially supporting institutions and organizations in the research of hearing disorders. Originally known as The Robinson Foundation for Hearing Disorders, it was renamed in 2006 and has provided financial donations to numerous institutions involved in hearing loss research and education. The purpose of the foundation has been "to administer funds for scientific, educational and charitable purposes; to encourage, promote and educate, through grants to institutions and organizations, as to the causes and cures for diseases and disabilities of the hearing impaired and to assist organizations and institutions in their social educational and academic advancement of programs for the youth, and carry on other charitable and educational activities associated with these goals as allowed by law".

Recipients of donations include Benedict College, Morehouse College, and other universities. The foundation has taken action against donation recipients who do not use funds in accordance with its mission statement, such as the Albany State University, which was made to return a $3 million donation after not using the funds for over a decade. The foundation houses its executive offices at the historic RPM International Building, originally the home of Ray Charles Enterprises and now also home to the Ray Charles Memorial Library on the first floor, which was founded on September 23, 2010 (what would have been his 80th birthday). The library was founded to "provide an avenue for young children to experience music and art in a way that will inspire their creativity and imagination", and is not open to the public without reservation, as the main goal is to educate mass groups of underprivileged youth and provide art and history to those without access to such documents.

Personal life
Charles stated in his 1978 autobiography, Brother Ray: Ray Charles' Own Story, that he became hooked on women after losing his virginity at 12 years old to a woman about 20. "Cigarettes and smack [heroin] are the two truly addictive habits I've known. You might add women," he said. "My obsession centers on women—did then [when young] and does now. I can't leave them alone," he added.

Relationships and children 
Charles was married twice. His first marriage lasted less than a year, his second 22 years. Throughout his life Charles had many relationships with women with whom he fathered a dozen children.

His first marriage to Eileen Williams lasted from July 31, 1951, until 1952.

He met his second wife Della Beatrice Howard Robinson (called "Bea" by Charles) in Texas in 1954. They married the following year on April 5, 1955. Their first child together, Ray Charles Robinson Jr., was born in 1955. Charles was not in town for the birth because he was playing a show in Texas. The couple had two more sons, David and Robert. They raised their children in View Park, California. Charles felt that his heroin addiction took a toll on Della during their marriage. Due to his drug addiction, extramarital affairs on tours and volatile behavior, the marriage deteriorated and she filed for divorce in 1977 and it was finalized after 22 years of marriage.

Charles had a six-year-long affair with Margie Hendrix, one of the original Raelettes, and in 1959 they had a son, Charles Wayne. His affair with Mae Mosley Lyles resulted in a daughter, Renee, born in 1961. In 1963, Charles had another daughter, this one by Sandra Jean Betts, named  Sheila Raye Charles. Sheila Raye, like her father, was a singer/songwriter who died of breast cancer on June 15, 2017. In 1977, Charles had a child with his Parisian lover Arlette Kotchounian whom he met in 1967. His long-term girlfriend and partner at the time of his death was Norma Pinella.

Charles fathered a total of 12 children with ten different women:

 Evelyn Robinson, born in 1949 (daughter with Louise Flowers)
 Ray Charles Robinson Jr., born May 25, 1955 (son with wife Della Bea Robinson)
 David Robinson, born in 1958 (son with wife Della Bea Robinson)
 Charles Wayne Hendricks, born on October 1, 1959 (son with Margie Hendricks, one of the Raelettes)
 Robert Robinson, born in 1960 (son with wife Della Bea Robinson)
 Renee Robinson, born in 1961 (daughter with Mae Mosely Lyles)
 Sheila Robinson, born in 1963 (daughter with Sandra Jean Betts)
 Reatha Butler, born in 1966
 Alexandra Bertrand, born in 1968 (daughter with Mary-Chantal Bertrand)
 Vincent Kotchounian, born in 1977 (son with Arlette Kotchounian)
 Robyn Moffett, born in 1978 (daughter with Gloria Moffett)
 Ryan Corey Robinson den Bok, born in 1987 (son with Mary Anne den Bok)

Charles held a family luncheon for his 12 children in 2002, ten of whom attended. He told them he was mortally ill and $500,000 had been placed in trusts for each of the children to be paid out over the next five years.

Drug abuse and legal problems
At 18, Charles first tried marijuana when he played in McSon Trio and was eager to try it as he thought it helped musicians create music and tap into their creativity. He later became addicted to heroin for seventeen years. Charles was first arrested in 1955, when he and his bandmates were caught backstage with loose marijuana and drug paraphernalia, including a burnt spoon, syringe, and needle. The arrest did not deter his drug use, which only escalated as he became more successful and made more money.

In 1958, Charles was arrested on a Harlem street corner for possession of narcotics and equipment for administering heroin.

Charles was arrested on a narcotics charge on November 14, 1961, while waiting in an Indiana hotel room before a performance. The detectives seized heroin, marijuana, and other items. Charles, then 31, said he had been a drug addict since the age of 16. The case was dismissed because of the manner in which the evidence was obtained, but Charles' situation did not improve until a few years later.

On Halloween 1964, Charles was arrested for possession of heroin at Boston's Logan Airport. He decided to quit heroin and entered St. Francis Hospital in Lynwood, California, where he endured four days of cold turkey withdrawal. Following his self-imposed stay, he pleaded guilty to four narcotic charges. Prosecutors called for two years in prison and a hefty fine, but the judge listened to Charles' psychiatrist, Dr. Hacker's account of Charles' determination to get off drugs and he was sent to McLean Hospital in Belmont, Massachusetts. The judge offered to postpone the verdict for a year if Charles agreed to undergo regular examinations by government-appointed physicians. When Charles returned to court, he received a five-year suspended sentence, four years of probation, and a fine of $10,000.

Charles responded to the saga of his drug use and reform with the songs "I Don't Need No Doctor" and "Let's Go Get Stoned" and the release of Crying Time, his first album since kicking his heroin addiction in 1966.

Chess hobby
Charles enjoyed playing chess. As part of his therapy when he quit heroin, he met with psychiatrist , who taught him how to play chess, three times a week. He used a special board with raised squares and holes for the pieces. When questioned if people try to cheat against a blind man, he joked in reply, "You can't cheat in Chess... I'm gonna see that!" In a 1991 concert, he referred to Willie Nelson as "my chess partner". In 2002, he played and lost to the American grandmaster and former U.S. champion Larry Evans.

Death
In 2003, Charles had successful hip replacement surgery and was planning to go back on tour, until he began having other ailments. He died at his home in Beverly Hills, California, of complications resulting from liver failure, on June 10, 2004, at the age of 73. His funeral took place on June 18, 2004, at the First African Methodist Episcopal Church of Los Angeles, with numerous musical figures in attendance. B.B. King, Glen Campbell, Stevie Wonder and Wynton Marsalis each played a tribute at the funeral. He was interred in the Inglewood Park Cemetery.

His final album, Genius Loves Company, released two months after his death, consists of duets with admirers and contemporaries: B.B. King, Van Morrison, Willie Nelson, James Taylor, Gladys Knight, Michael McDonald, Natalie Cole, Elton John, Bonnie Raitt, Diana Krall, Norah Jones and Johnny Mathis. The album won eight Grammy Awards, including Best Pop Vocal Album, Album of the Year, Record of the Year and Best Pop Collaboration with Vocals (for "Here We Go Again", with Norah Jones), and Best Gospel Performance (for "Heaven Help Us All", with Gladys Knight); he also received nods for his duets with Elton John and B.B. King. The album included a version of Harold Arlen and E. Y. Harburg's "Over the Rainbow", sung as a duet with Johnny Mathis, which was played at Charles' memorial service.

Discography

Charles' discography is highly complex and extensive. AllMusic has listed approximately 60 original albums and more than 200 compilation albums, while music essayist Robert Christgau noted the existence of more. At least 20 record labels have released near-identical compilations of Charles' pre-Atlantic Records tracks, while many of the masters that Charles began to own after 1960 were not digitally reissued, leading the Atlantic sister label Rhino Entertainment to focus on rereleasing his mid-to-late 1950s music. Christgau has called Charles' discography a "monumental mess" and that "any map of his oeuvre must be personal and provisional".

Filmography

Film

Television

See also 
 Album era
 Progressive soul

Notes

References

External links
 Ray Charles Wife wiki

 
 Daily Telegraph obituary
 Oral history video excerpts at the National Visionary Leadership Project
 Country Music Hall of Fame
 Appearance at WFOY Radio building
 
 
 
 
 
 

 
1930 births
2004 deaths
20th-century American keyboardists
20th-century American singers
20th-century jazz composers
20th-century organists
ABC Records artists
African-American country musicians
African-American jazz composers
African-American jazz musicians
African-American jazz pianists
African-American male singers
African-American male singer-songwriters
African-American pianists
African-American rock musicians
African-American rock singers
American baritones
American blues pianists
American blues singers
American contemporary R&B singers
American country pianists
American country singer-songwriters
American gospel singers
American jazz composers
American jazz organists
American jazz pianists
American jazz singers
American male jazz composers
American male jazz musicians
American male jazz pianists
American male organists
American male pop singers
American male singer-songwriters
American pop keyboardists
American pop pianists
American pop rock singers
American rhythm and blues keyboardists
American rhythm and blues singers
American rock keyboardists
American rock pianists
American rock singers
American rock songwriters
American soul keyboardists
American soul singers
Atlantic Records artists
Blind musicians
American blind people
Blind singers
Burials at Inglewood Park Cemetery
Columbia Records artists
Country musicians from California
Country musicians from Florida
Country musicians from Georgia (U.S. state)
Deaths from liver failure
Grammy Award winners
Grammy Lifetime Achievement Award winners
Jazz musicians from California
Jazz musicians from Florida
Kennedy Center honorees
Liberty Records artists
McLean Hospital patients
Musicians from Albany, Georgia
Musicians from Jacksonville, Florida
People from Greenville, Florida
People from View Park–Windsor Hills, California
Rock and roll musicians
Rhythm and blues pianists
Singers from Los Angeles
Singer-songwriters from California
Singer-songwriters from Florida
Singer-songwriters from Georgia (U.S. state)